The Dubai Turf, known as Dubai Duty Free 1996 to 2014. is a Group 1 flat horse race in the United Arab Emirates for four-year-old and above thoroughbreds run over a distance of 1,800 metres (1 mile 1 furlong) on the turf at Meydan Racecourse in Dubai during the Dubai World Cup Night in March.

It was first run in 1996 on dirt, with a distance of 2,000 metres (1 mile 2 furlongs). It was transferred to turf, and a distance of 1,777 metres, in 2000. The race attained Group 1 status in 2002. The name of the race is taken from its sponsors, Dubai Duty Free. Between 1996 and 2009 it was run at Nad Al Sheba Racecourse. Since 2010 it has been run in Meydan, where it is run at 1,800 metres.

In 2006, the race became the second leg of the four race Asian Mile Challenge.

The Dubai Duty Free Stakes currently offers a purse of US$5 million, which places it and the Dubai Sheema Classic among the richest races on turf in the world. 

From 2015, DP World Signs sponsorship with Meydan Group, the race name renamed to Dubai Turf.

Records
Speed  record: (at current distance of 1,800 metres and Meydan Racecourse)
1:45.52 – Just A Way (2014)

Most wins:
 2 - Lord North (2021,2022)

Most wins by a jockey:
 3 – Frankie Dettori (1997, 2021, 2022)

Most wins by a trainer:
 6 – Saeed bin Suroor (1997, 1998, 1999, 2000, 2013, 2018)

Most wins by an owner:
 4 – Godolphin Racing (1997, 1998, 2013, 2018)

Winners

See also
 List of United Arab Emirates horse races

References

Racing Post:

External links
 Dubai World Cup press release regarding Asian Mile Challenge

Open mile category horse races
Horse races in the United Arab Emirates
Recurring events established in 1996
Nad Al Sheba Racecourse
1996 establishments in the United Arab Emirates